Douglas Munro or Monroe may refer to:

 Douglas Albert Munro (1919–1942), United States Coast Guardsman and posthumous Medal of Honor recipient
 Douglas Munro (actor) (1866–1924), English actor
 Doug Munro (1917–1989), Australian rules footballer for Essendon
 Douglas Monroe, a character from The Walking Dead comic book series